Laurence Henry Collinson (7 September 1925 – 10 November 1986) was a British and Australian playwright, actor, poet, journalist, and secondary school teacher.

Biography
Born in Leeds, England, Collinson's family moved to Australia in 1930. While still at Brisbane State High School, Collinson and fellow students Barrie Reid and Cecel Knopke started the magazine Barjai: A Meeting Place for Youth, which from 1943 ti 1944 published the literary avant-garde in Adelaide and Melbourne. He received a secondary teaching diploma from Merrer House in Melbourne and from 1955 to 1961 taught mathematics and English in various Melbourne secondary schools. 
From 1961 to 1964, Collinson worked as the editor of The Educational Magazine.
In 1964, he returned to England. His play Thinking Straight was produced by Inter-Action as part of their Homosexual Acts season, opening 10 March 1975 at the Almost Free Theatre. In the 1970s he worked in his West Hampstead apartment as a Gestalt / Transactional Analysis group therapist.   
Collinson died in London 10 November 1986

Select Credits
Nude with Violin (1965)

Bibliography
Cupid's Crescent, Grandma Press, 1973 (self-published)

References

1925 births
1986 deaths
Australian poets
English emigrants to Australia
Australian dramatists and playwrights
People educated at Brisbane State High School
20th-century English poets
20th-century English dramatists and playwrights
English male dramatists and playwrights
English male poets
20th-century English male writers
Writers from Brisbane
Writers from Leeds